Allan Jinks (29 December 1913 – 7 November 1997) was an Australian cricketer. He played eight first-class cricket matches for Victoria between 1936 and 1948.

See also
 List of Victoria first-class cricketers

References

External links
 

1913 births
1997 deaths
Australian cricketers
Victoria cricketers
Cricketers from Melbourne